HMT Haarlem was a trawler, launched in late 1937. She was requisitioned by the Royal Navy during the Second World War and supported British efforts as an Anti-Submarine naval trawler.

Returned to her owners after the end of the war, she continued as a trawler until being scrapped in Hendrik Ido Ambacht, Netherlands.

References
Haarlem at uboat.net

1937 ships
Anti-submarine trawlers of the Royal Navy
Ships built in Selby